Urdvassnutene  is a mountain consisting of two peaks. The highest summit is borderpoint between the counties of Buskerud and Sogn og Fjordane in southern Norway.

References 

Mountains of Viken
Mountains of Vestland